Prim Lyza (born December 25, 1993) is a Cambodian actress and fashion model.

Early life
Lyza was born in Singapore on December 25, 1993. She was the fifth child in the family of six children. In 1999, Lyza's father died of illness, and she left Singapore to live in Phnom Penh with her mother who ran a business in Cambodia. In Phnom Penh, she attended the School of Fine Arts until grade ten.

Lyza is tri-racial, having part-Vietnamese and Chinese heritage.

Career
Lyza started work in showbiz when she was 13 years old, and has appeared in works by production companies such as FCI, SSB, Hang Meas, and Sunday Productions. She has also acted in karaoke videos, television commercials, as well as in the music video for the Chhay Virakyuth song Money has killed my heart.

In 2009, she won second prize for Natural Beauty in The Secret of the Night program in Vietnam.

In 2013, Lyza received the Most Popular Actress award on Cambodian entertainment awards show Anachak Dara. The award was decided by SMS voting rather than the awards committee; this led to some controversy with criticism on social media from people who felt that she was not deserving of the award.

Filmography

References

21st-century Cambodian actresses
1993 births
Cambodian film actresses
Cambodian people of Chinese descent
Cambodian people of Vietnamese descent
Living people